Kala Keerthi Monica Ruwanpathirana (1946 – 2004) was a Sri Lankan poet and writer. She is considered one of most acclaimed poets in modern Sinhala poetry. She has written 23 books, including nineteen poetry and three of them won the State Literary Award. In 2005, she was honored by Government of Sri Lanka with the reputation of Kala Keerthi.

Born in a village in Matara, Monica had her education at St. Thomas' Girls' High School, Galle and Sanghamitta Balika Vidyalaya. In 1967, she graduated from the University of Colombo and joined the Plan Implementation Ministry where she worked for eleven years. Later she started working for an NGO as a director. She died at the age of 58.

Publications
Her books of verse include,

Apa Denna Saha Thawath Kihipa Denek (1971)
Thahanam Deshayakin (1972)
Angulimalage Sihina (1974)
Oba Yeheliya Eya Geheniya (1975)
Athuru Mithuru (1981)
Age Lokaya (1985)
Visi Vasaka Shesha Pathraya (1994)
Asan Paththini Devathavi (1999)
Hippocrates Saha Roginiya 

Short stories

Kusumalathage Dawasak (A Day in the Life of Kusumalatha, 1990)

Critical essays
Nava Kavi Vimasuma

References

External links
Tribute to nation's poet: Monica, my friend Daily News (Sri Lanka)
ශිෂ්‍යාවකගෙන් හසුනක්‌: මොනිකා රුවන් පතිරණ (in Sinhala) Divaina

Sinhalese writers
1946 births
2004 deaths
Sri Lankan women poets
20th-century Sri Lankan writers
20th-century Sri Lankan women writers
21st-century Sri Lankan writers
21st-century Sri Lankan women writers